Lakhi Rai Bhatti was a ruler of Khairpur (now called Khairpur Tamewali), in Bahawalpur, Pakistan. Later his state was captured by the Baloch tribes with the support of Ahmad Shah Abdali in 18th century. Raav is the Indian title for kings used in medieval India.

At the age of 15, Mani Singh was married to Seeto Bai Ji , daughter of Lakhi Rai yadovanshi Rao of Khairpur . After his marriage Mani Singh spent some time with his family in his village Alipur. List of Bhai Mani Singh's sons:

 Chitar Singh, martyred with Mani Singh in Lahore in 1734.
 Bachitar Singh, martyred in the battle of Nihan near Anandpur Sahib in 1704.
 Udai Singh, martyred in Sahi Tibi near Anandpur Sahib in 1704.
 Anaik Singh, killed in the battle of Chamkaur in 1704.
 Ajab Singh, killed in the battle of Chamkaur in 1704.
 Ajaib Singh, killed in the battle of Chamkaur in 1704.
 Gurbaksh Singh, martyred with Mani Singh in Lahore in 1734.
 Bhagwan Singh
 Balram Singh
 Desa Singh – the author of the Rahetnama (Code of conduct) of the Khalsa.

Seven of Mani Singh's sons were from his first wife, Seeto Bai Ji and the remainder from his second wife Khemi Bai Ji .
His cousin, includes Sardar Bhagwant Singh Bangeshwar was a rajput ruler of Aurangzeb time . Bhai Mani Singh was from a distinguished family of Sikh warriors. His brother, Bhai Dayala who attained martyrdom at Delhi with Guru Tegh Bahadur. Eleven brothers of Bhai Mani Singh and 7 out of 10 children attained martyrdom.

Historical Evidence
The matrimonial alliance between the rulers of Alipur and Khairpur is documented as —

Chadi janet pur ali thin, dhuki Khairpur beech

Dekhan Aaye baraat ko, gaon thi uch aur neech

Teer Satdrav (Sutlej) nadi k base Khairpur gaon

Lakhi Rai  Dhaan rahe Jadubansi Raav (King)

— Written by Bhatt Sewa Singh Kaushish in Shaheed Bilas Bhai Mani Singh

References

History of Punjab
Indian monarchs